Kilmanaghan is a civil parish which spans the counties of Offaly and Westmeath in Ireland.

Geography
Kilmanaghan is one of four civil parishes in the barony of Clonlonan (Westmeath) and 4 civil parishes in the barony of Kilcoursey (Offaly), both in the Province of Leinster.

Kilmanaghan civil parish comprises the town of Moate, 10 townlands in County Westmeath and 22 Townlands in County Offaly.

The neighbouring civil parishes are: Ballyloughloe and Kilcumreragh to the north, Ardnurcher or Horseleap and Kilbride to the east, Lemanaghan and
Rahan  to the south and Kilcleagh to the west.

References

External links
Kilmanaghan civil parish at the IreAtlas Townland Data Base
Kilmanaghan civil parish, County Westmeath at townlands.ie
Kilmanaghan civil parish, County Offaly at townlands.ie
Kilmanaghan civil parish, County Westmeath at The Placenames Database of Ireland
Kilmanaghan civil parish, County Offaly at The Placenames Database of Ireland

Civil parishes of County Westmeath
Civil parishes of County Offaly